"Gunnin'" is the fifth single by Canadian pop punk band Hedley off their debut self-titled album. The song was also included on the American release version of Never Too Late. The song was written by the members of the band and by Dave Genn. The single also topped Canada's MuchMusic Countdown in 2006.

Background
The music video for "Gunnin'" was directed by Kevin De Freitas and Chris Sargent and released in 2006. In 2007, the song won "Best Pop Video" at the MMVAs. "Gunnin'" reached number one on Canada's MuchMusic Countdown in the week of December 1, 2006.

Commercial performance
"Gunnin'" reached number 27 on the Billboard Canada CHR/Top 40. The song peaked at number 31 on Billboard Canada Hot AC.

Awards and nominations

Track listing

Personnel
Credits for "Gunnin'" adapted from AllMusic.

Hedley
 Jacob Hoggard – lead vocals
 Dave Rosin – guitar
 Tommy Mac – bass guitar

Additional musicians
 Peter Barone - drums
 Dave Genn – guitar
 Ben Kaplan - guitar
 Brooks McKenna - guitar

Production
 Josh Bluman - assistant engineer
 Mike Cashin – mixing assistant 
 Chris Crippin - composer
 Mike Fraser – mixing
 GGGarth – producer
 Ben Kaplan - programming
 Dean Maher - engineer
 James Morin - assistant engineer
 Shawn Penner - assistant engineer
 Kano Yajima - assistant engineer

Charts

References

2006 songs
Hedley (band) songs
Songs written by Jacob Hoggard